Campomanesia reitziana is a species of plant in the family Myrtaceae. It is endemic to Brazil.  It is threatened by habitat loss.

References

reitz
Endemic flora of Brazil
Flora of the Atlantic Forest
Flora of São Paulo (state)
Flora of Santa Catarina (state)
Near threatened flora of South America
Taxonomy articles created by Polbot